Anthony Hunter may refer to:

 Anthony R. Hunter (born 1943), British-American biologist
 Anthony Hunter (bishop) (1916–2002), Anglican bishop of Swaziland

See also
 Tony Hunter (American football) (born 1960), former American football tight end 
 Tony Hunter (running back) (born 1963), former American football running back
 Tony Hunter (wide receiver) (born 1963), former Canadian football wide receiver